Frederick Landis Fitzsimmons (July 28, 1901 – November 18, 1979) was an American professional baseball right-handed pitcher, manager, and coach, who played in Major League Baseball (MLB) from  to  with the New York Giants and Brooklyn Dodgers. In  he set an NL record, which stood until , with a single-season winning percentage of .889 (16–2).

Playing career
Born in Mishawaka, Indiana, Fitzsimmons broke in with the Giants in August 1925, posting a 6–3 record over the rest of the year. In , the first full season after Bill Terry took over from John McGraw as manager, he won 16 games with a 2.90 earned run average as the Giants won the NL pennant; in the 1933 World Series against the Washington Senators, he suffered a 4–0 defeat in Game 3, though it was New York's only loss as they captured their first title since .

However, his career then began to plateau. His troubles returned in the 1936 World Series against the New York Yankees; he lost Game 3 by a 2–1 score, and was bombarded in the final Game 6 loss, leaving in the fourth inning while trailing 5–2. Brooklyn shortstop Leo Durocher praised his new teammate's competitiveness, saying, "I wish we had nine guys like Fitz. We'd never lose." His .889 winning percentage broke the NL record of .842 (16–3) shared by Tom L. Hughes ( Boston Braves) and Emil Yde ( Pittsburgh Pirates), and stood until Roy Face posted an 18–1 mark (.947) with the  Pirates.

He almost earned his long-elusive World Series victory against the Yankees, holding them to four hits through seven innings in Game 3. But he was forced to leave with a 0–0 score after being struck in the kneecap by a line drive hit by Marius Russo, which caromed into Pee Wee Reese's glove to end the inning. His replacement surrendered two runs in the eighth, and New York triumphed 2–1.

Fitzsimmons compiled a 217–146 (.598) record with an ERA of 3.51 and 870 strikeouts in 513 games and 3,223 innings pitched. According to Durocher, Fitzsimmons would tell hitters in advance that he was going to throw a brushback pitch. Offensively, he was a better than average hitting pitcher in his career. He compiled a .200 average (231–1155) with 112 runs, 103 RBI and 14 home runs. In four World Series appearances, he batted .375 (3–8).

Manager and coach
He then returned to the active list and made nine appearances for the  Dodgers before Brooklyn released him July 27. The following day, the tail-ending Philadelphia Phillies tabbed him as their manager, replacing Bucky Harris and ending Fitzsimmons' playing career. 

He managed the Phillies through the middle of the  season, compiling only 105 wins against 181 losses (.367). After World War II, Fitzsimmons became a coach with the Boston Braves, Giants (–), Chicago Cubs (–), and Kansas City Athletics. He also managed in minor league baseball. On Durocher's Giants staff, Fitzsimmons finally earned a championship as a coach for the 1954 World Series team.

Fitzsimmons died of a heart attack at age 78 in Yucca Valley, California. He was buried at Montecito Memorial Park, in Colton, California.

See also
 List of Major League Baseball career wins leaders

References

External links

Freddie Fitzsimmons at SABR (Baseball BioProject)
Freddie Fitzsimmons at Baseball Biography
Freddie Fitzsimmons at This Day in Baseball
Freddie Fitzsimmons at The Deadball Era

Freddie Fitzsimmons Interview (sound recording) by Eugene C. Murdock, Ph.D., on June 16, 1978, in Yucca Valley, California (1 hr.). Available on the Cleveland Public Library's Digital Gallery.

1901 births
1979 deaths
Baseball players from Indiana
Binghamton Triplets managers
Boston Braves coaches
Brooklyn Dodgers coaches
Brooklyn Dodgers players
Chicago Cubs coaches
Indianapolis Indians players
Kansas City Athletics coaches
Major League Baseball first base coaches
Major League Baseball pitchers
Major League Baseball pitching coaches
Minneapolis Millers (baseball) managers
Minor league baseball managers
Muskegon Muskies players
New York Giants (NL) coaches
New York Giants (NL) players
People from Mishawaka, Indiana
Philadelphia Phillies managers